Political entities in the 8th century – Political entities in the 10th century – Political entities by year
This is a list of political entities in the 9th century (801–900) AD.

Political entities

See also
List of Bronze Age states
List of Iron Age states
List of Classical Age states
List of states during Late Antiquity
List of states during the Middle Ages

References

+09
9th century
9th century-related lists